The following units and commanders fought in the Battle of Rain.

Swedish Army
King Gustav II of Sweden

Infantry
 Hand Infantry Regiment (Swedish)
 Hand Infantry Regiment (Swedish)
 Second Infantry of the 3rd Regiment (Danish)
 Hastger Infantry Regiment (Finnish)
 Royal Guard Coy (Mixed)
 N. Brahe Infantry Regiment (German)
 Winckel Infantry Regiment (German)
 Thurn Infantry Regiment (German)
 Baner Infantry Regiment (German)
 Bernard Saxe-Weimar Infantry Regiment (German)
 Burt Infantry Regiment (German)
 Chemnitz Infantry Regiment (German)
 Forbes Infantry Regiment (German)
 Horn Infantry Regiment (German)
 Kagge Infantry Regiment (German)
 Kanoffsky Infantry Regiment (German)
 Liebenstein Infantry Regiment (German)
 Mitschefall Infantry Regiment (German)
 Mitzlaff Infantry Regiment (German)
 Monro of Fowles Infantry Regiment (German)
 Riese Infantry Regiment (German)
 Schaffalitsky Infantry Regiment (German)
 B. Schlammersdorf Infantry Regiment (German)
 T. Schlammersdorf Infantry Regiment (German)
 Schneidwinds Infantry Regiment (German)
 Truchsess Infantry Regiment (German)
 Wildenstein Infantry Regiment (German)
 Hepburn Infantry Regiment (Scottish)
 Mackay Infantry Regiment (German)
 Spens (German)

Cavalry
 Stenbock Cuirassier (Swedish)
 Soop Cuirassier (Swedish)
 Silversparre Squadron (Swedish)
 Sack Squadron (Swedish)
 Sperreuter Squadron (Swedish)
 Stålhandske Cuirassier (Finnish)
 Tesenhaussen (Livonian)
 Domhoff Squadron (Kurland)
 Baudissin Cuirassier (German)
 B. Saxe-Weiver Cuirassier (German)
 Horn Cuirassier (German)
 Kotchtitzky Cuirassier (German)
 Baden Cuirassier (German)
 Monro of Fowles Cuirassier (German)
 Schonberg Cuirassier (German)
 Soms Squadron (German)
 Sperreuter Cuirassier (German)
 Streiff Squadron (German)
 Tott Cuirassier (German)
 Truchsess Cuirassier (German)
 Uslar Cuirassier (German)
 Wedel Cuirassier (German)
 W. Saxe Weimer Cuirassier (German)
 Ohm Cuirassier (German)
 Horn Leib Coy (German)
 Du Menys Dragoon (German)
 Taupadel Dragoon (German)

Holy Roman Empire - Catholic League Army
John Tserclaes, Count of Tilly

Infantry
 Alt-Till Infantry Regiment (Catholic League-Wurzburg)
 Reinach Infantry Regiment (Catholic League-High German)
 Comargo Infantry Regiment (Catholic League-High German)
 Pappenheim Infantry Regiment (Catholic League-High German)
 Wahl Infantry Regiment (Catholic League-High German)
 Jung-Furstenberg Infantry Regiment (Catholic League-High German)
 Free Companies Infantry Regiment (Catholic League-High German)
 Beck Infantry Regiment (Imperialist-Walloon)
 Conteras Infantry Regiment (Imperialist-German)
 Savelli Infantry Regiment (Imperialist-Low German)
 Witzleban Infantry Regiment (Imperialist-German)
 Baldiron Infantry Regiment (Imperialist-Spanish)
 Fahrenbach Infantry Regiment (Imperialist-High German)
 Rittberg Infantry Regiment (Imperialist-German)

Cavalry
 Cronberg Heavy Cavalry (Catholic League-High German)
 Billehe Heavy Cavalry (Catholic League-High German)
 J. Fugger Cuirassier (Catholic League-Low German)
 Blankhart Cuirassier (Catholic League-Low German)
 D'Espagne Cuirassier (Catholic League-Low German)
 Cratz Cuirassier (Catholic League-High German)
 Hasslang Cuirassier (Catholic League-High German)
 Merode Cuirassier (Catholic League-High German)
 Free Coy (Catholic League-High German)
 Dragoons (Catholic League-High German)
 O.H. Fugger Croats (Catholic League-High German)
 Merode Arquebussier (Imperialist-Walloon)
 Bucquoy Heavy Cavalry (Imperialist-Walloon)
 Free Coy (Imperialist-High German)
 Croats Light Cavalry (Imperialist-Croatian)

Sources

 Welsh, William E. "The Lion Conquers Bavaria: The Battle of the Lech, April 1632." Strategy & Tactics, Number 229 (July/August 2005) ISSN 1040-886X

Thirty Years' War orders of battle